Radio Impuls is a Top40/hit radio station broadcasting in Cluj-Napoca, Romania. The station is owned by Turkish conglomerate Doğan Holding, which also owns the television channel Kanal D.

External links
 Official website

Radio stations in Romania
Romanian-language radio stations
Mass media in Cluj-Napoca